Riaz Kail (born 10 November 1988) is a Pakistani first-class cricketer who played for Abbottabad cricket team.

References

External links
 

1988 births
Living people
Pakistani cricketers
Abbottabad cricketers
Cricketers from Peshawar
Khyber Pakhtunkhwa cricketers